Weak formulations are important tools for the analysis of mathematical equations that permit the transfer of concepts of linear algebra to solve problems in other fields such as partial differential equations. In a weak formulation, equations or conditions are no longer required to hold absolutely (and this is not even well defined) and has instead weak solutions only with respect to certain "test vectors" or "test functions".  In a strong formulation, the solution space is constructed such that these equations or conditions are already fulfilled.

The Lax–Milgram theorem, named after Peter Lax and Arthur Milgram who proved it in 1954, provides weak formulations for certain systems on Hilbert spaces.

General concept
Finding the solution  of the equation

is equivalent to finding  such that, for all ,

Here,  is called a test vector or test function.

To bring this into the generic form of a weak formulation, find  such that

by defining the bilinear form

Example 1: linear system of equations
Now, let  and  be a linear mapping. Then, the weak formulation of the equation

involves finding  such that for all  the following equation holds:

where  denotes an inner product.

Since  is a linear mapping, it is sufficient to test with basis vectors, and we get

Actually, expanding  we obtain the matrix form of the equation

where  and 

The bilinear form associated to this weak formulation is

Example 2: Poisson's equation
To solve Poisson's equation 

to derive the weak formulation. Then, testing with differentiable functions  yields

The left side of this equation can be made more symmetric by integration by parts using Green's identity and assuming that  on 

This is what is usually called the weak formulation of Poisson's equation. Functions in the solution space  must be zero on the boundary, and have square-integrable derivatives.

The generic form is obtained by assigning

and

The Lax–Milgram theorem
This is a formulation of the Lax–Milgram theorem which relies on properties of the symmetric part of the bilinear form. It is not the most general form.

 bounded:  and
 coercive: 

Then, for any  there is a unique solution  to the equation

and it holds

Application to example 1
Here, application of the Lax–Milgram theorem is a stronger result than is needed.

In particular, we have 
Since this implies in particular that no eigenvalue is zero, the system is solvable.

Additionally, this yields the estimate

where  is the minimal real part of an eigenvalue of

Application to example 2
Here, choose  with the norm

But, we see that  and by the Cauchy–Schwarz inequality, 

Therefore, for any  there is a unique solution  of Poisson's equation and we have the estimate

See also
 Babuška–Lax–Milgram theorem
 Lions–Lax–Milgram theorem

References

External links
MathWorld page on Lax–Milgram theorem

Partial differential equations
Numerical differential equations
Theorems in functional analysis